The Conspiracy and Protection of Property Act 1875 (38 & 39 Vict c 86) is an Act of the Parliament of the United Kingdom relating to labour relations, which together with the Employers and Workmen Act 1875, fully decriminalised the work of trade unions.  Based on an extension of the conclusions of the Cockburn Commission, it was introduced by a Conservative government under Benjamin Disraeli.

The Act held that a trade union could not be prosecuted for act which would be legal if conducted by an individual.  This meant that labour disputes were civil matters, not for consideration by criminal courts.  One result of this was that picketing was decriminalised.  The law also made certain forms of stalking illegal.

Sections 6 and 7 of this Act were repealed for the Republic of Ireland by the Non-Fatal Offences Against the Person Act 1997, section 31 and Schedule.

The Act has been repealed by the Statute Law (Repeals) Act 2008 (c.12), Schedule 1, Part 3.

The provisions of the Conspiracy and Protection of Property Act 1878 of South Australia, the Conspiracy and Protection of Property Act 1889 of Tasmania, and the Conspiracy and Protection of Property Act 1900 of Western Australia, were derived from the Conspiracy and Protection of Property Act 1875.

See also
Trade Union Act 1871

References
Thomas James Arnold. The Conspiracy and Protection of Property Act, 1875 (38 & 39 Vict. c. 86), and the Employers and Workmen Act, 1875 (38 & 39 Vict. c. 90). Shaw & Sons. Fetter Lane and Crane Court, London. 1876. Google Books.
George Howell. A Handy-Book of the Labour Laws. Third Edition, Revised. Macmillan & Co. London (and New York). 1895. Chapters 4 and 5. Pages 37 to 58.

United Kingdom labour law
United Kingdom Acts of Parliament 1875
Trade union legislation
Criminal law of the United Kingdom
1875 in labor relations